Kiki is a unisex given name, a nickname and a surname.

Given name
 Kiki Bertens (born 1991), Dutch former tennis player
 Kiki Byrne (1937–2013), Norwegian-born London fashion designer
 Kiki Gyan (1957–2004), Ghanaian keyboardist with the band Osibisa
 Kiki Kogelnik (1935–1997), Austrian painter, sculptor and filmmaker
 Kiki McDonough, British jewellery designer
 Kiki Smith (born 1954), American feminist artist

Nickname

 Kiki Carter (born 1957), American environmental activist, singer/songwriter and columnist
 Kiki Curls (born 1968), Democratic member of the Missouri Senate
 Kiki Cutter (born 1951), American alpine skier
 Kiki Cuyler (1898–1950), American baseball player
 Kiki Camarena (1947–1985), murdered undercover agent for the United States Drug Enforcement Administration
 Kiki Dimoula (born 1931), Greek poet
 Kiki Divaris (c. 1925–2015), Greek fashion designer
 Ruth Bader Ginsburg (1933-2020), Associate Justice of the Supreme Court of the United States, whose family nickname was "Kiki"
 Kiki Håkansson (c. 1929-2011), winner of the first Miss World beauty pageant in 1951
 Jean-Jacques Kilama (born 1985), Cameroonian-born Hong Kong footballer
 Kiki Musampa (born 1977), Dutch footballer
 Kiki Preston (1898–1946), American socialite who allegedly had a son out of wedlock fathered by Prince George, Duke of Kent
 Kiki Sanford (born 1974), American research scientist in neurophysiology
 Kierra Sheard (born 1987), American gospel and R&B singer
 Kiki Shepard (born 1951), African-American television host
 Kiki Sheung (born 1958), Hong Kong actress
 Kiki VanDeWeghe (born 1958), American basketball player and sports analyst

Surname
 Albert Maori Kiki (1931–1993), Papua New Guinea pathologist and politician
 Dani Kiki (born 1988), Bulgarian footballer

See also
Keke (disambiguation)

Lists of people by nickname